The 2018–19 Czech National Football League was the 26th season of the Czech Republic's second tier football league. SK Dynamo České Budějovice won their third second division title, and were promoted.

From FNL 

 Opava (promoted to 2018–19 Czech First League)
 Příbram (promoted to 2018–19 Czech First League)
 Olympia Prague (relegated to Bohemian Football League)
 Frýdek-Místek (relegated to Moravian–Silesian Football League)

To FNL 

 Zbrojovka Brno (relegated from 2017–18 Czech First League)
 Vysočina Jihlava (relegated from 2017–18 Czech First League)
 Chrudim (promoted from 2017–18 Bohemian Football League)
 Prostějov (promoted from 2017–18 Moravian–Silesian Football League)

Team overview

League table

Results
Each team plays home-and-away against every other team in the league, for a total of 30 matches played each.

References

Czech Republic
Czech National Football League
Czech National Football League seasons